Romance of Red Dust, also known as The Three Musketeers and The Lady in Red, is a Chinese television series based on the Tang dynasty legend of the "Three Heroes of Wind and Dust" (風塵三俠) — Hong Fu Nü, Li Jing and Qiu Ran Ke. The series was first broadcast on CTV in Taiwan in 2006.

Cast
 Shu Qi as Hong Fu Nü
 Wallace Huo as Li Jing
 Yu Rongguang as Qiu Ran Ke
 Li Junfeng as Li Shimin
 Hou Yong as Li Yuan
 Kwong Wa as Dugu Cheng
 Kent Cheng as Yang Su
 Yvonne Yao as Princess Pingyang
 Liu Yun as Chisu
 Jia Nailiang as Yang Xuangan
 Pang Yongzhi as Cheng Yaojin
 Dong Zhihua as Li Ke
 Si Guangmin as Madam Hua
 Wang Xingkai as Li Yuanji
 Luo Xiangjin as Baoqin

External links
  Romance of Red Dust on Sina.com

2006 Chinese television series debuts
Television series set in the Sui dynasty
Television series set in the Tang dynasty
Chinese wuxia television series
Mandarin-language television shows